USS Luce Bros. (SP-846) was a United States Navy patrol vessel in commission from 1917 to 1919.

Luce Bros. was built as a commercial "Menhaden Fisherman"-type fishing trawler of the same name in 1877 by the Alberton & Douglas Machine Company at New London, Connecticut. She was rebuilt in 1912-1913 by the White Shipbuilding Company at Sharptown, Maryland.

On 3 May 1917, the U.S. Navy acquired Luce Bros. from her owner, the Dennis Fish & Oil Company of Cape Charles, Virginia, for use as a section patrol boat during World War I. The Navy took delivery of her in July 1917, and she was commissioned at Berkley, Virginia, as USS Luce Bros. (SP-846) on 9 August 1917.

Assigned to the 5th Naval District and based at Norfolk, Virginia, Luce Bros. served in the Norfolk and Hampton Roads area on harbor patrol and guard ship duty and in naval intelligence operations for the rest of World War I.

Luce Bros. was decommissioned on 24 January 1919 and returned to the Dennis Fish & Oil Company on 28 March 1919.

Notes

References

SP-846 Luce Bros. at Department of the Navy Naval History and Heritage Command Online Library of Selected Images: U.S. Navy Ships -- Listed by Hull Number: "SP" #s and "ID" #s -- World War I Era Patrol Vessels and other Acquired Ships and Craft numbered from SP-800 through SP-899
NavSource Online: Section Patrol Craft Photo Archive Luce Bros. (SP 846)

Patrol vessels of the United States Navy
World War I patrol vessels of the United States
Ships built in New London, Connecticut
1877 ships